Superstar is the first Japanese extended play by South Korean boy group Shinee. It was released digitally on June 28, 2021 through EMI Records and SM Entertainment Japan with its physical release following a month later on July 28. The EP contains five songs including the lead single, "Superstar". It reached number one on Oricon's weekly album chart.

Background and release
On May 23, 2021, Shinee commemorated the 10th anniversary of their debut in Japan with an online fan meeting, Bistro de Shinee. They announced the release of their upcoming Japanese album, their first in three years, and previewed two new songs, "Superstar" and "Seasons". Lead single "Superstar" was released on digital music platforms the following day. "Superstar" is a dance-pop song with the message, "Let's live our lives trusting ourselves instead of comparing ourselves with others." On June 25, it was announced that Shinee would release the digital edition of the EP on June 28, followed by the physical release a month later on July 28. The EP features the two songs already previewed, as well as three additional tracks: a Japanese version of Shinee's previous Korean release, "Don't Call Me", "Atlantis", and another new Japanese song, "Closer". The music video for "Superstar" premiered on YouTube on June 29.

Commercial performance
Superstar debuted at number seven on Billboard Japan Hot Albums on the chart issue dated July 7, 2021. It rose to number two following the release of the EP's physical edition on July 28. The EP also debuted at number one on the weekly Oricon Albums Chart, selling 73,975 copies in the first week. It was Shinee's first release to top the chart since 2018's Shinee The Best From Now On, and their fourth overall. Superstar was certified Gold by RIAJ for selling 100,000 album shipments.

Track listing

Charts

Weekly charts

Year-end charts

Certifications and sales figures

Release history

References

Shinee EPs
2021 EPs
EMI Records EPs
SM Entertainment EPs
Japanese-language EPs